Moss railway station served the village of Moss, South Yorkshire, England from 1871 to 1953 on the East Coast Main Line.

History 
The station opened on 2 January 1871 by the North Eastern Railway. It closed to both passengers and goods traffic on 8 June 1953.

References

External links 

Disused railway stations in Doncaster
Former North Eastern Railway (UK) stations
Railway stations in Great Britain opened in 1871
Railway stations in Great Britain closed in 1953
1871 establishments in England
1953 disestablishments in England